CyberSlam was a professional wrestling supercard event and fan convention produced by Extreme Championship Wrestling (ECW) from 1996 to 2000.

Background
It began in 1995 with the Double Tables event, held at the ECW Arena. The event was held for those who were posting on Usenet's rec.sport.pro-wrestling to be able to meet performers in person and see some live pro wrestling. ECW's Tod Gordon assisted the ECW fans in organizing this. Prior to the ECW Arena show on February 4, 1995, there was a show held at the Flagstaff in Jim Thorpe, Pennsylvania. The red shirts seen on some wrestlers and fans say "To The Extreme" and was the nickname given to the event. In addition to the two shows, there was also a question-and-answer session held at the ECW Arena itself. The main guests were Tod Gordon, the Sandman and The Public Enemy. Once the wrestlers began to arrive for the show, they came out to mingle and chat with the fans. Another event was held during the summer of 1995, called "Back to the Extreme". This time, the Q&A session was held at the Holiday Inn in Essington, Pennsylvania.

In 1996, Paul Heyman christened the event "CyberSlam". There were two events of CyberSlam in 1997. Every year, the convention included a question and answer session.

Dates, venues and main events

See also
 List of professional wrestling conventions

References

External links
 

 
Recurring events established in 1996
Recurring events disestablished in 2000